Flaig is a surname. Notable people with the surname include:

Egon Flaig (born 1949), German ancient historian and public intellectual
Markus Flaig (born 1971), German bass-baritone